The 1918 season of Úrvalsdeild was the seventh season of league football in Iceland. The league this expanded to four teams with Víkingur joining the league for the first time as Fram won the championship.

League standings

Results

References

Úrvalsdeild karla (football) seasons
Iceland
Iceland
Urvalsdeild